Tony Hazell (born 19 September 1947 in High Wycombe) is an English former footballer who made 564 appearances in the Football League playing as a defender for Queens Park Rangers, Millwall, Crystal Palace and Charlton Athletic.

Hazell joined Queens Park Rangers as a 15-year-old, and made his professional debut in October 1964 against Gillingham. He was a member of the 1966–67 side that won both the Third Division Championship and the League Cup, defeating West Bromwich Albion 3–2 at Wembley Stadium.

Hazell played 369 League games for QPR before transferring to Millwall in 1974, where he played 153 League games. He later had a short spell at Crystal Palace and a little longer with Charlton Athletic before retiring.

Following his retirement from football, Hazell worked as a technician for British Telecom.

References

1947 births
Living people
Sportspeople from High Wycombe
English footballers
Association football defenders
Queens Park Rangers F.C. players
Millwall F.C. players
Crystal Palace F.C. players
Charlton Athletic F.C. players
English Football League players
British Telecom people
Footballers from Buckinghamshire